Thomas James Wren (4 March 1907 – 1973) was an English professional footballer who played as a left back.

Career
Born in Rossington, Wren spent his early career with Rossington Colliery and Huddersfield Town. He signed for Bradford City from Huddersfield Town in December 1928. He made 2 league appearances for the club, before joining Portsmouth in June 1930. He later played for Norwich City, Bristol City and Tunbridge Wells Rangers. He died in Lambeth in 1973.

Sources

References

1907 births
Date of death missing
English footballers
Rossington Main F.C. players
Huddersfield Town A.F.C. players
Bradford City A.F.C. players
Portsmouth F.C. players
Norwich City F.C. players
Bristol City F.C. players
Tunbridge Wells F.C. players
English Football League players
Association football fullbacks